The Oxford University Liberal Democrats is the student branch of the Liberal Democrats for students at the University of Oxford, with the purpose to support, develop, improve and promote the
policies and candidates of the Liberal Democrats and liberal values within Oxford and the university.

It is affiliated with the federal Young Liberals, and is involved in activism and campaigning alongside the Young Liberals.

It is the official successor to both the Oxford University Liberal Club and the Oxford University Social Democrats, which voted to merge early in 1987, about a year in advance of the national parties.

History

The Oxford University Liberal Club was founded in 1913, with the stated aim to "rally progressive members of the University to the support of Liberal principles". Its foundation date makes it the oldest political society founded at an English university. It was formed from a merger of two older Liberal societies at Oxford, the Russell Club, and the Palmerston Club, both of which dated to at least the 1870s, and had as their goals the promotion of liberal politics. Around in the early 1900s was also a society called the 'Liberal League', founded "in defence of free trade".

Originally holding premises on the corner of Cornmarket Street and George Street, open for the majority of the day, the society was modeled after the usual gentlemen's clubs of the day, before the arrival of World War I and the general reduction in the student body of Oxford. The society faced further problems in the 1920s, as around half of its members defected and joined the newly established Labour Club, as well as the New Reform Club, a pro-Lloyd George group, reflecting the division of the national Liberal Party at the time.

Revitalization occurred with the coming to the fore of Harold Wilson, Treasurer in Hilary 1935, along with Frank Byers as president and Raymond Walton as secretary. Efforts made to provide a stronger draw to the society – including the institution of a society newspaper and library – had membership treble to over 300. Membership continued to grow during and after the war, with its peak hit under the Presidency of Jeremy Thorpe in 1950, of over 1000 members. By this point, the Liberal Club had become more of a social club, including drinking events, balls, and parties, some of which are continued by the society in its modern form.

Turbulence for the national party meant turbulence for the society itself, however, and the party's catastrophic collapse in the 1960s, combined with mergers throughout the late 1970s and 1980s, led to a smaller membership and a series of renamings and mergers for the society at large. After merging the Oxford University Liberal Club and the Oxford University Social Democrats in 1987, however, the society in its present structure was formed, with a smaller membership focussed more heavily on campaigning, but maintaining the social functions from its post-war heyday.

See also
 Cambridge University Liberal Association
 Oxford University Conservative Association
 Oxford University Labour Club

References

External links
The Friends of OULD, for information on the history of OULD and its predecessors

Organisations associated with the Liberal Democrats (UK)
Liberal Democrats
Liberal Democrats
Politics of Oxford
Student wings of political parties in the United Kingdom